Alden is a town in Erie County, New York, United States. The population was 10,865 at the 2010 census. The town is derived from a family name known to early settlers.

Alden is in the northeast part of Erie County, east of Buffalo. It contains a village also called Alden.

History
The town of Alden, which had previously been part of Clarence, was established on March 27, 1823 and codified in the Laws of the State of New York, Sess.46, ch. 89 (1823). Part of Alden was later given up to form the town of Marilla in 1853.

In 1856, the community of Alden in the town set itself off by incorporating as a village. The town was made more popular by the discovery of the black water baths in 1891. People would travel from Buffalo and from areas far east of the town to experience the healing powers of the black water baths.

Geography
Ellicott Creek, a tributary of Tonawanda Creek and thence the Niagara River, flows westward through the north-central part of the town. Cayuga Creek, a tributary of the Buffalo River, flows westward through the southern part of the town.

The east town line is the border of Genesee County (town of Darien), while part of the south town line forms the border of Wyoming County (town of Bennington). Alden is also bordered by the town of Newstead (north), the town of Lancaster (west), and the town of Marilla (south).

U.S. Route 20 (Broadway) is an east–west highway across the south part of the town, and New York State Route 33 is a highway across the northern part.

Climate
This climatic region is typified by large seasonal temperature differences, with warm to hot (and often humid) summers and cold (sometimes severely cold) winters.  According to the Köppen Climate Classification system, Alden has a humid continental climate, abbreviated "Dfb" on climate maps.

Demographics

As of the census of 2000, there were 10,470 people, 3,278 households, and 2,484 families residing in the town.  The population density was 303.9 people per square mile (117.3/km2). There were 3,398 housing units at an average density of 98.6 per square mile (38.1/km2). The racial makeup of the town was 90.96% White, 6.77% Black or African American, 0.29% Native American, 0.23% Asian, 0.06% Pacific Islander, 1.43% from other races, and 0.27% from two or more races. Hispanic or Latino of any race were 2.72% of the population.

There were 3,278 households, out of which 32.8% had children under the age of 18 living with them, 64.3% were married couples living together, 7.7% had a female householder with no husband present, and 24.2% were non-families. 20.1% of all households were made up of individuals, and 9.3% had someone living alone who was 65 years of age or older. The average household size was 2.65 and the average family size was 3.06.

In the town, the population was spread out, with 20.8% under the age of 18, 7.0% from 18 to 24, 31.8% from 25 to 44, 23.9% from 45 to 64, and 16.6% who were 65 years of age or older. The median age was 40 years. For every 100 females, there were 119.1 males. For every 100 females age 18 and over, there were 121.7 males.

The median income for a household in the town was $47,472, and the median income for a family was $53,969. Males had a median income of $32,458 versus $26,302 for females. The per capita income for the town was $18,698. About 4.2% of families and 5.9% of the population were below the poverty line, including 8.0% of those under age 18 and 7.0% of those age 65 or over.

Notable people
 Lyman K. Bass, born in Alden, United States congressman
 Josephine Penfield Cushman Bateham (1829-1901), social reformer, editor, writer
 Mike Cole, former New York State Assemblyman
 Edmund F. Cooke, former US congressman
 Roswell F. Cottrell, Seventh-day Adventist Church advocate who lived in Millgrove
 Paul G. Gassman, organic chemist
 Charles H. Larkin, Wisconsin pioneer politician
 Doreen Taylor, country singer.      
 Adam Zyglis, political cartoonist

Communities and locations in Alden 
Alden - the Village of Alden in the east part of the town on US-20.
Alden Center – located by Westwood Road and Sandridge Road.
Alden Station – A location between Alden village and Crittenden.
Crittenden – A hamlet at Genesee Street (NY-33) and Crittenden Road.  Many businesses are located around this important intersection.
Dellwood – A location on the western town line.
Looneyville - A hamlet located on Townline Road at Walden Avenue, north of the hamlet of Dellwood.
Millgrove – A small hamlet of several businesses and many residences around the intersection of Genesee Street (NY-33) and N. Millgrove Road. Many of the original businesses have been closed or converted to others uses.
Peters Corners – A location at the intersection of Genesee Street (NY-33) and South Newstead Road, composed of a few scattered residences.
Town Line –  a location on the western town line.
Town Line Station – A location at the western town line, bordering the town of Lancaster. It is north of Town Line.
Wende – A region in the northwest corner of the town, where several public institutions are located.
West Alden – A location at the intersection of Broadway and Sandridge Road, west of the village of Alden.

Additional information about Alden
The Erie County Correctional Facility, and Wende Correctional Facility are located in the northwest part of the town.

The Alden Advertiser is a local newspaper servicing the community.

References

External links

 Town of Alden official website

Buffalo–Niagara Falls metropolitan area
Towns in Erie County, New York